Timothy John Keating (born November 16, 1948) is a retired United States Navy admiral. During his career, he served as commander of Carrier Group Five, the United States 5th Fleet, the United States Northern Command and North American Aerospace Defense Command (NORAD), and United States Pacific Command. He retired in 2009 after more than 38 years of service. He was the first navy officer to head Northern Command and NORAD.

Early life
Keating was born on November 16, 1948, in Dayton, Ohio.

Naval career
Keating graduated from the United States Naval Academy in 1971. Following duty aboard  in the western Pacific, he completed flight training in August 1973 and was designated as a Naval Aviator. He then served in Attack Squadron 82 (VA-82), flying the A-7 Corsair II, deploying twice to the Mediterranean Sea aboard .

In September 1978, Keating joined Attack Squadron 122 (VA-122) at NAS Lemoore, California, and later served with Carrier Air Wing FIFTEEN (CVW-15) as Staff Landing Signal Officer, embarking aboard  and deploying to the Western Pacific/Indian Ocean.

From May 1982 to July 1984, as Administrative Officer, Operations Officer and Maintenance Officer of Attack Squadron 94 (VA-94), Keating deployed twice to the Western Pacific aboard . His next assignment was Aide and Flag Lieutenant to the Commander in Chief, U.S. Pacific Command.

In May 1987, after having transitioned to the F/A-18 Hornet and previously serving as squadron executive officer, Keating assumed command of Strike Fighter Squadron 87 (VFA-87) and deployed with Carrier Air Wing EIGHT (CVW-8) aboard  to the North Atlantic and to the Mediterranean.

Keating then became a Chief of Naval Operations Fellow with the Strategic Studies Group in Newport, Rhode Island. Following duty with the Joint Task Force Southwest Asia in Riyadh, Saudi Arabia, he deployed as Deputy Commander, Carrier Air Wing NINE (CVW-9) aboard  to the Persian Gulf, assuming command of CVW-9 in July 1993. In November 1994, Admiral Keating became Commander of the Naval Strike and Air Warfare Center at NAS Fallon, Nevada.

Keating returned to the Naval Military Personnel Command in September 1995 as Director, Aviation Officer Distribution Division (Pers 43). He then served as the deputy director for Operations (Current Operations/J33), with the Operations Directorate of the Joint Staff (JS J-3) in Washington, D.C., from August 1996 until June 1998. In September 2000, Admiral Keating reported to OPNAV in Washington as Deputy Chief of Naval Operations for Plans, Policy and Operations (N3/N5). In February 2002, he assumed command of United States Naval Forces Central Command and United States Fifth Fleet in Manama, Bahrain. From October 13, 2003, to October 21, 2004, Keating served as the Director, Joint Staff. Keating commanded of United States Northern Command and the North American Aerospace Defense Command from 5 November 2004 to 23 March 2007. Keating became Commander, United States Pacific Command on 26 March 2007. He served as ComPac until 19 October 2009, just before his retirement.

Awards and decorations
Keating's awards include:

He also has over 5,000 flight hours and 1,200 arrested landings.

Personal
Keating married Wanda Lee Doerksen. He has two stepchildren.

Notes

References

United States Pacific Command

1948 births
Living people
Military personnel from Dayton, Ohio
United States Naval Academy alumni
United States Naval Aviators
United States Navy personnel of the Gulf War
Recipients of the Air Medal
Recipients of the Legion of Merit
United States Navy admirals
Recipients of the Navy Distinguished Service Medal
Recipients of the Defense Distinguished Service Medal
North American Aerospace Defense Command
20th-century American naval officers
21st-century American naval officers
Recipients of the Humanitarian Service Medal